"Could've Been Me" is a song written by Reed Nielsen and Monty Powell, and performed by American country music artist Billy Ray Cyrus. It was released in July 1992 as the second single from his multi-platinum selling debut album, Some Gave All. The song reached number 2 on the U.S. Hot Country Singles & Tracks chart, and it also reached number 1 on the Canadian RPM Country Tracks chart. It was the follow-up to the number 1 song, "Achy Breaky Heart".

Critical reception
Deborah Evans Price, of Billboard magazine reviewed the song favorably, calling it a "flair of Springsteen-ish style." She states to "look for the multiformat ball to keep on rolling."

Music video
The music video was directed by Marc Ball and produced by Kitty Moon, and premiered in mid-1992.

Charts

Weekly charts

Year-end charts

References

1992 songs
1992 singles
Billy Ray Cyrus songs
Mercury Records singles
Songs written by Monty Powell
Songs written by Reed Nielsen